The Pearls Naval Brigade was formed on 11 September 1857 when 175 officers and men of Royal Navy ship  formed a Naval Brigade which operated ashore during the Indian Mutiny with the Gurkhas and Sikhs providing artillery support. The Pearl and the frigate   were despatched from Hong Kong to Calcutta in July 1857 after receiving news of the rebellion. En route, they rescued the crew of the transport HMS Transit, which wrecked off Bangka Island, Sumatra.

The Brigade engaged in numerous actions against the rebel forces and most notably in the campaign that led to the Relief of Lucknow. They fought alongside a similar brigade formed by the crew of the Shannon, which was captained by William Peel , son of Prime Minister Sir Robert Peel and Victoria Cross recipient. The Shannons brigade landed a considerable force of mobile guns and rifle companies, while the Pearls Naval Brigade deployed mostly rifle companies. Capt. Peele took his men rapidly inland to Allahabad and Cawnpore, but he was severely injured at the Siege of Lucknow.

For 10 months, the Brigade was commanded by the Pearls captain, Edward Southwell Sotheby, who was later raised to the ranks of Admiral and knighted. For their role in suppressing the Indian uprising, Sotheby and his brigade were mentioned in dispatches on 13 occasions relating to the operations in Oudh, and received thanks of the governor-general of India and of both Houses of Parliament. For his service, Sotheby was made a Companion of the Order of the Bath (CB) and appointed an extra aide-de-camp to Queen Victoria.  Peel was awarded a knighthood in January 1858, only to die of smallpox at Cawnpore in April.

References

Bibliography
'Cruise of the Pearl with an Account of the Operations of the Naval Brigade in India' by Royal Navy Chaplain Rev. E A Williams Publisher: Naval & Military Press (2006)

External links
Entry in the Navy Records Society
The Naval Brigades in the Indian Mutiny
Pearl's Naval Brigade on the Royal Navy History website

Brigades of the United Kingdom
Royal Navy ad hoc formations
Indian Rebellion of 1857
19th-century history of the Royal Navy
1857 establishments in India